Daniel J. White (born October 28, 1979) is an American university sports administrator. He is the athletic director for the Tennessee Volunteers. White held the same position at the University at Buffalo from 2012 to 2015 and the University of Central Florida from 2015 to 2021.  Prior to his tenure at Buffalo, he was the senior associate athletic director for Ole Miss.

Early life and college career
Danny has been heavily surrounded by college athletics throughout his life. Born in Morehead, Kentucky when his father Kevin was a track coach at Morehead State University, he moved many times during his father's later career as a coach and athletic director—to Cape Girardeau, Missouri (Southeast Missouri State University), Dubuque, Iowa (Loras College), Orono, Maine (University of Maine), New Orleans (Tulane University), and Tempe, Arizona (Arizona State University). After Danny's graduation from high school, his father went on to become AD at the University of Notre Dame, and now holds the same position at Duke University. His brother Mike White is the head coach of the Georgia Bulldogs  men's basketball team, while his other brother Brian is athletic director for the Florida Atlantic Owls, and his sister Mariah Chappell is assistant athletic director for the SMU Mustangs.

White attended Towson University for three years (1998–2001) and was on the basketball team, but saw limited playing time and also suffered from major knee problems, missing all of the 1999–2000 season and playing only one game in 2000–01. He transferred to Notre Dame, playing there for one season. He graduated from Notre Dame in 2002, majoring in business administration, and from Ohio University, receiving master's degrees in both business administration and sports administration. He completed his doctorate from the University of Mississippi in 2016.

Administrative career

Non-AD positions
Prior to his first athletic director position, White was the senior associate athletic director at the University of Mississippi, worked on development (fundraising) at Fresno State, and worked as an administrator at other Mid-American Conference schools, Ohio University and Northern Illinois University.

University at Buffalo
White's first athletic director position was for the Buffalo Bulls, where he was at the forefront of Buffalo's rebranding to become "New York's big time athletics department". He initiated a long-term capital funding project to develop Buffalo's athletic facilities, notoriety, reputation, and stature to represent the State of New York. During his time as Athletic Director, White restructured Buffalo's athletic department through its management and coaches. His most notable change was the replacement of Reggie Witherspoon for Bobby Hurley, a former 2-time NCAA champion with Duke University and son of star coach, Bob Hurley.

University of Central Florida
In November 2015, White was hired as the athletic director of the UCF Knights, replacing interim AD George O'Leary (who replaced previous AD Todd Stansbury). In the position, White also was the executive vice president for the University of Central Florida Athletics Association, the private non-profit corporation that is responsible for the administration and financial management of the UCF Knights athletic programs. As UCF's director of athletics, White oversaw the hiring of a new head football coach, Scott Frost, and was given responsibility of directing over $70 million in athletic facility construction and upgrades. In addition to Frost's hiring, White's administration also oversaw the hiring of current men's basketball coach Johnny Dawkins, baseball coach Greg Lovelady, and Frost's successor Josh Heupel.

In 2016, he and South Florida Bulls AD Mark Harlan oversaw the creation of an official "War on I–4" competition series, rebranding the long-running unofficial rivalry between the two schools.

UCF football national championship claim

White generated significant media attention, both positive and negative, for himself and UCF by declaring the 2017 UCF Knights football team national champions in a January 1, 2018, Twitter video published moments after their Peach Bowl victory over the Auburn Tigers, reinforcing the claim the following day with national champions branding on UCF's verified accounts and plans to hold a Disney World parade, hang a national champions banner at Spectrum Stadium, and pay the assistant coaching staff bonuses for their performance. The claim came in response to UCF not being selected for the College Football Playoff despite an undefeated season and conference championship. The claim sparked debate over whether the College Football Playoff should be expanded to include teams such as UCF that are not in Power Five conferences. Still, the supposed championship was celebrated with a Disney World parade, coaches' bonuses and national champion rings. Reactions to White's claim extended past the sports world to the Florida state legislature, with Florida governor Rick Scott signing a resolution declaring UCF national champions on January 8, 2018.

University of Tennessee 
On January 21, 2021 White was hired as athletic director at the University of Tennessee. One of his first acts as AD was to hire Josh Heupel away from UCF to become the Volunteers' new head football coach.

In a move that was not publicized until the SEC released 2022 conference schedules, White canceled the game vs. Army on September 17, 2022. Instead, Tennessee played Akron in a game scheduled by White in February 2021.

Notes

The NCAA does recognize the Knights as a National Champion for 2017 per pg. 117 of the 2019 Official NCAA Record Book.

References

External links

 Tennessee Volunteers bio

1979 births
Living people
People from Morehead, Kentucky
Basketball players from Kentucky
Basketball players from New Orleans
Basketball coaches from Kentucky
Basketball coaches from Louisiana
Guards (basketball)
Towson Tigers men's basketball players
Notre Dame Fighting Irish men's basketball players
Ohio Bobcats men's basketball coaches
Ohio University alumni
University of Mississippi alumni
Buffalo Bulls athletic directors
UCF Knights athletic directors
Tennessee Volunteers and Lady Volunteers athletic directors